Thomas Reilly (born 15 September 1994) is a professional footballer who plays as a midfielder or forward for Darvel. He has also played for St Mirren, Elgin City, Forfar Athletic and Kelty Hearts, as well as Albion Rovers on loan.

Club career

St Mirren
Reilly was born in Irvine. A member of St Mirren's under-19 squad, in November 2011, Reilly was sent on loan to Albion Rovers to gain first team experience. On his return he made his Scottish Premier League debut as a substitute aged just 17 against Hearts at Tynecastle.

After limited chances in the Saints first team, Reilly did feature more in season 2014–15 – mainly as a substitute – but failed to win a new contract during pre-season in the summer of 2015, and as such was released by the club.

Albion Rovers (loan)
On 16 November 2011 he joined Scottish Second Division side Albion Rovers on a month loan deal. Reilly made his debut on 19 November as a substitute against Ross County in the Scottish Cup, with his league debut coming on 26 November against Stenhousemuir. After four appearances his loan was extended for another month. In all he made six appearances whilst on loan with his last appearance coming on 2 January against Airdrie United.

Elgin City
On 11 September 2015, Reilly signed for Scottish League Two club Elgin City. Reilly spent three seasons with Elgin before departing in May 2018.

Forfar Athletic
In May 2018, Reilly agreed to sign for Scottish League One side Forfar Athletic for the 2018–19 season.

International
Reilly has represented Scotland at under-15 and under-16 level during 2009. He made his under-17 debut on 3 August 2010 against Sweden as a substitute. In all he made six appearances for the under-17 team.

Career statistics

Honours
Kelty Hearts
Lowland League: 2019–20

References

1994 births
Living people
Footballers from Irvine, North Ayrshire
Scottish footballers
Association football forwards
Scotland youth international footballers
St Mirren F.C. players
Albion Rovers F.C. players
Elgin City F.C. players
Forfar Athletic F.C. players
Scottish Premier League players
Scottish Football League players
Scottish Professional Football League players
Kelty Hearts F.C. players
Lowland Football League players